The Quebrada Magunchal is a river in the Luya Province of the Amazonas Region in Peru. Its coordinates are Latitude -5.8875 and Longitude -78.19.

Rivers of Peru
Rivers of Amazonas Region